Kainady village is located in Neelamperoor grama panchayat in Alappuzha district of Kerala, India.

Geography
Kainady is a small island and consists of picturesque paddy fields and small canals. Population consists of Hindu and Christian denominations. Our Lady of Dolours Church and Karumathra Temple are two main places of worship in Kainady.

Celebrities
Kainady is the birthplace of Pallithanam Luca Matthai (popularly known as Pallithanathu Mathaichan) who was the member of Sree Moolam Popular Assembly during the 1920s. He pioneered the backwater paddy cultivation in Kuttanadu. In 1900 he reclaimed Cherukara Kayal and Pallithanam Kayal from the Vembanad Kayal for paddy cultivation. He is considered as the father of cooperative agricultural movement in Kuttanadu. He spearheaded the debt relief struggle and was instrumental in the enactment of Agricultural Debt Relief Act, that emancipated the illfated agriculture families from the debt trap. He was the founder of Kuttanadu Karshaka Sangham, which was considered as the voice of Kuttanad's farmers.

Eapen Kandakudy, son of Shri Jacob Kandakudy was born on 25 November 1944. He was member of 5th Kerala legislative assembly. He was the chairman of MILMA in 1980. Moreover, he actively participated in the struggle for the swift implementation of the Thanneermukkam Bund Project.Expired on 25-01-1989

History
In 1921, under the influence of the then member of Sree Moolam Popular Assembly, Pallithanam Luca Matthai Kainady church obtained a permission from the Travencore King to start St. Mary's School which is the main educational institution in Kainady. In 1960, this school was renamed as A.J John Memorial School in honour of the eminent Catholic leader and Chief minister A. J. John, Anaparambil.

Renowned botanist Joseph Pallithanam belonged to this place. Social activist Thomas Pallithanam is also from Kainady.

Nature
Kainady is a very scenic place of Kerala amidst the back water paddy fields but blessed in many ways with water and road transports. This village is very much at the brink of Kuttandan Kayals but is very close and connected to Kottyam and Changanacherry towns.

References

Villages in Alappuzha district